The 2019 Memphis 901 FC season was the inaugural season for Memphis 901 FC in the USL Championship, the second-tier professional soccer league in the United States and Canada.

Club

Current roster

Competitions

Preseason

USL Championship

Standings

Match results

The 2019 USL Championship season schedule for the club was announced on December 19, 2018.

Unless otherwise noted, all times in Central time

U.S. Open Cup

As a member of the USL Championship, Memphis 901 FC entered the tournament in the Second Round, played May 14–15, 2019

References

Memphis 901 FC
Memphis 901
Memphis
Memphis 901